is a Japanese former professional footballer who played as a striker.

Early life
Havenaar's parents came to Japan from the Netherlands in 1986 when his father Dido signed on to play for Hiroshima-based side Mazda FC of the Japan Soccer League (now Sanfrecce Hiroshima of the J1 League). His mother was an athlete and a former national champion in the heptathlon. His younger brother Nikki currently plays for FC Thun and has previously played for the U-17 and U-18 Japan national team as centre back. The Havenaar family became naturalized Japanese citizens in 1994.

Club career
Havenaar began his career with the Consadole Sapporo U-15 side, where his father played and later worked as goalkeeper coach.

When Dido moved to powerhouse Yokohama F. Marinos, Mike joined the Marinos youth side and promoted to the top team in 2006. Playing as a forward, Havenaar made his debut as a professional on 15 April 2006, against Gamba Osaka. Havenaar and his father are the first father-son combination to play in the J. League.

He was loaned to second division club Avispa Fukuoka and Sagan Tosu and showed respectable results.

In 2010, he joined Ventforet Kofu, scoring 20 goals in 30 appearances for the club, helping them gain promotion to J1 League.

In 2011, Havenaar returned to Division 1 with Venforet and netted 17 times in 32 appearances. He received the J. League Best Eleven award after the season. Despite his contendership for the Top Scorer award, Kofu was relegated at the end of the season.

Vitesse
On 21 December 2011, Dutch side Vitesse Arnhem announced that they completed the signing of Havenaar on a two-and-a-half-year contract beating out the likes of Bundesliga side Wolfsburg for his signature.

Havenaar made his debut for the club as a 73rd-minute substitute for Nicky Hofs in their 1–0 away defeat to rivals NEC Nijmegen.  His first goal came in his next appearance, a 3–1 loss to PSV.  Havenaar made his first start for Vitesse on 4 February 2012 and provided an assist to Nicky Hofs first goal of the season, securing a 1–0 win NAC Breda.  Havenaar scored his second goal for his new club in another losing effort, this time a 4–1 loss to title contenders FC Twente. Havenaar continued to impress for Vitesse, slotting the ball home after a cutting pass from Alexander Büttner to complete a 2–0 victory over De Graafschap on 4 March. Away against FC Groningen he made the third goal for Vitesse in the last minute, the game ended in 1–3 for Vitesse.

Córdoba
On 21 July 2014, it was announced by Córdoba CF that they had signed Havenaar. He made his La Liga debut on 25 August 2014, starting in a 0–2 away loss against Real Madrid.

On 30 December 2014 Havenaar was released by the Andalusians, after appearing in only five matches and scoring no goals during his spell for Córdoba CF.

HJK Helsinki
On 2 March 2015, it was announced by HJK Helsinki that they had signed Havenaar. He made his competitive debut for HJK on 6 March 2015 in the Finnish League Cup and scored the second goal in a 2–0 win. On 4 April 2015, Havenaar scored the second goal in the 57th minute to secure a 2–0 win and the League Cup against RoPS.

ADO Den Haag
On 11 August 2015, Dutch Eredivisie side ADO Den Haag announced that they had signed Mike Havenaar as a striker. On 3 July 2017, ADO Den Haag officially announced that Havenaar would be leaving the club  to move back to Japan and join J1 league side Vissel Kobe. During his two seasons at ADO, the striker scored a total of 27 goals, including a goal  on the last day of the 2016/17 season in the 4–1 win over Excelsior.

Vissel Kobe
On 3 July 2017, Havenaar joined Japanese J1 league side Vissel Kobe.

FC Bonbonera GIFU
On 26 January 2021, Havenaar joined Tōkai Adult Soccer League side FC.Bombonera.

International career
In 2007, Havenaar was picked to join the Japan U-20 squad to compete 2007 FIFA U-20 World Cup in Canada and played one match against Nigeria U-20.

In August 2011, he was called up to Japan's training squad.

He made his debut for Japan on 2 September 2011 as a 70th-minute substitute against North Korea in a 2014 FIFA World Cup qualifier match, striking the post. He scored his first ever goals for the national team with a brace, both headers, against Tajikistan on 11 October 2011 in the same competition. Japan won the game 8–0. Havenaar also participated in FIFA Confederations Cup 2013 coming on as a substitute and playing a total of 11 minutes in the competition.

Career statistics
.

1Includes Emperor's Cup and KNVB Cup.

2Includes J. League Cup.

3Includes UEFA Europa League.

4Includes Eredivisie Playoffs.

International

Goals for senior national team

Honors 
HJK Helsinki

Finish League Cup: 2015

Personal life
Havenaar is trilingual. He was brought up bilingual, speaking Japanese and his parents' native Dutch and learned fluent English at the Yokohama International School. Havenaar got married in 2011 and in the same year, his first daughter was born on 5 August. His younger brother Nikki is also a professional footballer.

References

External links

 
 
 
 
 Mike Havenaar at Voetbal International 
 
 
 

1987 births
Living people
Association football people from Hiroshima Prefecture
Japanese footballers
Japan youth international footballers
Japan international footballers
J1 League players
J2 League players
Eredivisie players
La Liga players
Mike Havenaar
Yokohama F. Marinos players
Avispa Fukuoka players
Sagan Tosu players
Ventforet Kofu players
Vissel Kobe players
Vegalta Sendai players
SBV Vitesse players
Córdoba CF players
ADO Den Haag players
Mike Havenaar
2013 FIFA Confederations Cup players
Japanese expatriate footballers
Japanese expatriate sportspeople in the Netherlands
Expatriate footballers in Spain
Japanese expatriate sportspeople in Spain
Expatriate footballers in Thailand
Japanese expatriate sportspeople in Thailand
Japanese people of Dutch descent
People educated at Yokohama International School
Naturalized citizens of Japan
Association football forwards
Veikkausliiga players
Expatriate footballers in Finland